Alem Toskić (born 12 February 1982) is a Serbian handball coach and former player.

Club career
In his home country, Toskić played for Fidelinka and Partizan (2004–2005), before moving abroad. He would go on to play for Zagreb (2005–2007), Celje (2007–2013), Vardar (2013–2016), Gorenje Velenje (2016–2018) and Csurgói KK (2018–2020).

International career
Toskić represented Serbia and Montenegro at the 2005 World Championship and 2006 European Championship. He would later play for Serbia in seven major tournaments, winning the silver medal at the 2012 European Championship.

Coaching career
In October 2019, Toskić began his coaching career as head coach of Csurgói KK.

Honours
Celje
 Slovenian First League: 2007–08, 2009–10
 Slovenian Cup: 2009–10, 2011–12, 2012–13
Vardar
 Macedonian Handball Super League: 2014–15, 2015–16
 Macedonian Handball Cup: 2013–14, 2014–15, 2015–16
 SEHA League: 2013–14

References

External links

 MKSZ record
 Olympic record
 
 

1982 births
Living people
People from Priboj
Serbian male handball players
Olympic handball players of Serbia
Handball players at the 2012 Summer Olympics
RK Partizan players
RK Zagreb players
RK Vardar players
Expatriate handball players
Serbian expatriate sportspeople in Croatia
Serbian expatriate sportspeople in Slovenia
Serbian expatriate sportspeople in North Macedonia
Serbian expatriate sportspeople in Hungary
Serbian handball coaches